Jayapura is a city in the Indonesian province of Papua.

Jayapura may also refer to:

 Jayapura, Chickmagalur, India
 Jayapura, Mysore, India
 Jayapura Regency, a regency in the Indonesian province of Papua
 Jaipur, the capital of Rajasthan state, India
 , a classical name of Sagaing, Myanmar

Other 
 Jaipur (disambiguation)